Merrimack High School (MHS) is the public secondary school of the town of Merrimack, New Hampshire. It is located in a central area of town on 38 McElwain Street. About 1,200 students from grades 9 through 12 are enrolled in the school.

The school is headed by Sharon E. Putney, the current principal, who has two assistant principals, Richard Zampieri and Peter Bergeron. Former principal Kenneth W. Johnson adopted the motto "Believe, go forward, and inspire" for the school.

Academics 
NE-CAP results from the 11th grade class at MHS showed that 64% of the students were proficient in reading, 33% were proficient in writing, and 27% were proficient in math, giving it a "GreatSchools" rating of 4 out of 10. In 2018, 271 students participated in the SAT exams and averaged scores of 530 on the reading/writing portion and 520 on the math portion. Furthermore, about 85% of graduates attended a college, 10% went straight to employment, and about 4% joined the armed forces, leaving 1% undecided of the 286 graduates.

Extracurricular activities 

Merrimack High School offers a variety of clubs and activities for the students to participate in.

Athletics 
The athletics teams from Merrimack High School are called the "Tomahawks", which are sometimes nicknamed the "Hawks". The school colors are royal blue and white. The school has teams for basketball, baseball, bowling, cheerleading, cross country, field hockey, football, golf, gymnastics, ice hockey, lacrosse, soccer, softball, swimming, tennis, track and field, and wrestling.

Non-competitive athletic extracurricular activities include archery, hiking/outdoors, and ski/snowboard club.

Artistic activities 
Artistic extracurricular activities include marching/concert band, jazz band, chorus, dance, photography, videography, ceramics/sculpture, drawing/painting, broadcast, and theater. The MHS videography department is notable for its yearly student-run spoof productions, such as "Matrix High School" and "Star Sports".

Science, Technology, Engineering, and Math (STEM) activities 
STEM activities include FIRST Robotics Competition team, math team, Science Olympiad

Student engagement and academic extracurricular activities 
Student engagement and academic extracurricular activities include Academy of Finance, environmental awareness, financial literacy, games (separate video and non- video games club), Gay-Straight alliance, health club, Interact club, Merrimack Mentors, Model UN, newspaper, Quiz Bowl, and the National Art Honors Society chapter #2538.

Notable alumni
 Matthew Kalish (class of 2000), co-founder of DraftKings
 Tim Schaller (class of 2009), National Hockey League player (Los Angeles Kings)

References

External links
Merrimack High School official site

Educational institutions in the United States with year of establishment missing
Public high schools in New Hampshire
Schools in Hillsborough County, New Hampshire
Merrimack, New Hampshire